This is a list of justices of the Supreme Court of Florida, with their tenure of service on the Court.

Current justices

Former justices

See also 
 Florida Constitution
 Government of Florida
 Judiciary of Florida

References 

Justices of the Florida Supreme Court
Florida
Justices